Presidential elections were held in Turkmenistan on 12 February 2017. This was Turkmenistan's fifth presidential election and decided who would be the country's president for the next seven years. Incumbent President Gurbanguly Berdimuhamedow won with more than 97% of the vote, similar to the results of the 2012 elections.

The result was widely expected; although the election was nominally contested by nine candidates, all opposition candidates were appointed by the government and the elections were regarded by foreign organisations as not being a free and fair contest.

Background
In September 2016, the constitution was changed to remove term limits and the 70 year-old age limit for presidential candidates, as well as extending the presidential term from five to seven years.

Electoral system
The President of Turkmenistan is elected using the two-round system.

Candidates 
The Democratic Party nominated the incumbent President, Gurbanguly Berdimuhamedow, who won 97.14% of the vote in the previous elections. A total of 9 candidates were approved by the Central Election Committee. The opposition candidates' manifestos were published in the state-controlled mass media.

Results

References

Turkmenistan
Presidential election
Presidential elections in Turkmenistan
February 2017 events in Asia
Election and referendum articles with incomplete results